Tombstone Hill is a prominent hill (1,050 m) on the north side of Edisto Glacier in the Admiralty Mountains, Victoria Land. Its summit is littered with slabs of hard sedimentary rock, many of which are steeply tilted on end to give the appearance of a field of tombstones. Named by New Zealand Geological Survey Antarctic Expedition (NZGSAE), 1957–58.

Hills of Victoria Land
Borchgrevink Coast